Pam Jenoff is an American author, lawyer, and professor of law at Rutgers University. She writes both love stories and historical novels, some of which have been nominated for awards and many of which have been bestsellers. She is still currently writing and lives with her 3 children and husband in New Jersey. Her books are highly recommended and have won prizes before.

Biography 
A resident of Haddonfield, New Jersey, Jenoff grew up in Evesham Township, where she attended Cherokee High School. Her mother "grew up in South Philadelphia in the 1940s"; "my dad’s family is from Atlantic City and my grandparents and great grandparents owned hotels and restaurants there in the 1930s and 40s."

Her bachelor's degree is from George Washington University and her M.A. (in history) is from Cambridge University. Her J.D. degree is from the University of Pennsylvania Law School. A former Special Assistant to the Secretary of the Army and a State Department officer, she lives in Philadelphia and currently teaches evidence, employment law, and legal writing at the Camden campus of Rutgers Law School.

She had just begun practicing law at a private firm when the 9/11 attacks spurred her to pursue a personal goal of becoming a writer.

Books 
The Kommandant's Girl (2007) was nominated for a Quill Award. Publishers Weekly described The Things We Cherished (2012) as "a timeless love story." Harlequin MIRA released The Other Girl on September 1, 2014.

Although Jenoff's State Department experience was in Poland, she says that she "wrote all my earlier books set in Europe [while] living in America" and her first novel set in the US while living in Poland.

The Last Summer at Chelsea Beach was begun some 20 years before its completion; Jenoff acknowledges Louisa May Alcott's Little Women as an inspiration for this novel.

The Lost Girls of Paris (2019) covers much the same ground as Susan Elia MacNeal's The Paris Spy (2017). Both novels rely on the history of Vera Atkins and the women she recruited and trained to work for Britain's Special Operations Executive during World War II.

List of works
Novels
 The Kommandant's Girl  (The Kommandant's Girl, #1) (2007)
 The Diplomat's Wife ((The Kommandant's Girl, #2) (2008)

 Almost Home (2008)

 A Hidden Affair

 The Things We Cherished

 The Ambassador's Daughter (Prequel to The Kommandant's Girl) (2013)
 The Winter Guest (2014)
 The Other Girl (2014)
 The Last Summer at Chelsea Beach (2015)
 The Orphan's Tale (2017)
 The Lost Girls of Paris (2019)
 The Woman with the Blue Star (2021)
 Code Name Sapphire (2023)

References 

American romantic fiction writers
American historical fiction writers
Rutgers School of Law–Camden faculty
Alumni of the University of Cambridge
Cherokee High School (New Jersey) alumni
George Washington University alumni
Living people
Lawyers from Philadelphia
People from Evesham Township, New Jersey
People from Haddonfield, New Jersey
University of Pennsylvania Law School alumni
Writers from Philadelphia
Year of birth missing (living people)